Aso oke fabric, (Yoruba: aṣọ òkè, pronounced ah-SHAW-okay) is a hand-woven cloth created by the Yoruba people of west Africa. Usually woven by men and women, the fabric is used to make men's gowns, called agbada and hats, called fila, as well as women's wrappers, called iro and head tie, called gele.

Aso oke is from the Yoruba culture in Kwara, Kogi, Ondo, Oyo, Ogun, Ekiti, Lagos, and Osun States in western Nigeria and Ajase in southeastern  Benin Republic.

The way of making the cloth has remained the same for centuries, however new techniques and production methods have been looked into to eliminate the weight and thickness of the aso oke cloth, and to make it more accessible for casual wear.

Types of aso oke
Other ways that designers have made this old traditional cloth become more modern is to "structurally manipulate and combine animal and floral motifs into definite shapes of grids and geometry, suitable for computer design applications." The basis of more traditional motifs would have originated from fables and folklore. 
 Sanyan type: woven from anaphe wild silk and cotton yarns
 Alaari type: woven with either synthetically or locally grown cotton and shinning threads, sometimes with perforated patterns
 Etu type: bears dark indigo colours with tiny white stripes noted for their simplicity.
Aso oke fabric is often worn with aran,  a brown velvet with concentric designs.

Yoruba women's garment
When people speak of an aso oke, they are usually referring to the traditional Yoruba women's garment, which consists of four parts:

 Buba: Yoruba blouse
 Iro: wrap skirt
 Gele: head tie
 Iborun or ipele: shawl or shoulder sash

Formal wear
Yorubas around the world wear aso oke fabric for special occasions, including holidays, weddings, funerals and chieftain title ceremonies. All followers of the Yoruba religion also wear aso oke fabrics and hats.

See also
 Adire: Yoruba tie-dye
 African textiles
 Fila (hat)
 Women's wrapper
 Agbada
 Kente cloth—Woven by Ashanti people
 Barkcloth—Woven by Buganda people

References

External links
 Asooke Style Collections
  2015/ 2016 Aso-oke Trends
 Aso-oke Gallery
 Yoruba clothing diagram with photos of men's and women's garments.
 african fabrics and fashion
Aso oke
Google Art exhibition

Nigerian clothing
Textile arts of Africa
Woven fabrics
Yoruba culture
Yoruba art